Heinrich Thannhauser (born February 16, 1859 in Hürben, today a district of Krumbach (Swabia); died 1934 on the German-Swiss border) was a German gallery owner and art collector. As an art dealer, he was one of the most important promoters of early Expressionist art in Germany.

Life 

The Jewish Thannhauser family came from Mönchsdeggingen. Heinrich Thannhauser first learned the profession of a tailor. He founded his Munich Modern Gallery  (Moderne Galerie)in 1904. At first he exhibited the artworks of French Impressionists such as Édouard Manet, Edgar Degas and Paul Gauguin. Later works by Pablo Picasso and Georges Braque were added.

In 1909, Thannhauser separated from his partner Franz Josef Brakl and continued to run the gallery under the name Galerie Thannhauser. The first exhibition of the Neue Künstlervereinigung München took place in the Arco-Palais in the same year. In 1911 he began collaborating with Der Blaue Reiter. In 1918 he had himself painted in Berlin simultaneously by Lovis Corinth and by Max Liebermann; the one he sat for a portrait in the morning, the other in the afternoon.

In 1920  his nephew Siegfried Rosengart opened a branch of the gallery in Lucerne.

In 1934 in attempting to flee from the Nazis to Switzerland, Thannhauser died of a stroke at the border.

Family 
His son Justin Thannhauser, who was also an art dealer, established branches in Lucerne (1919) and Berlin (1927). The parent company in the Arco-Palais, Theatinerstraße 7 in Munich, was dissolved in 1928. 

In 1937, the National Socialists confiscated the holdings. Justin Thannhauser emigrated to Paris, where he ran a gallery until 1941. Its inventory of artworks was confiscated during the Nazi occupation of Paris. Justin Thannhauser managed to escape to New York, where he continued to deal in art. In 1963 Justin Thannhauser donated his private collection as well as that of his father, Heinrich, to the Guggenheim Museum, New York, where a room commemorates him.  

Heinrich Thannhauser's daughter, Trude Thannhauser Beyer, also collected art.

Literature 

 Mario-Andreas von Lüttichau: Die Moderne Galerie Heinrich Thannhauser in München. In: Henrike Junge (Hrsg.): Avantgarde und Publikum: Zur Rezeption avantgardistischer Kunst in Deutschland 1905–1933. Böhlau, Köln, Weimar, Wien 1992.
 Thannhauser. Händler, Sammler, Stifter. Hrsg. v. Zentralarchiv des internationalen Kunsthandels e. V. ZADIK und SK Stiftung Kultur der Sparkasse KölnBonn. Sediment – Mitteilungen zur Geschichte des Kunsthandels, 11. Verlag für Moderne Kunst, Nürnberg 2006
 Emily D. Bilski: Die „Moderne Galerie“ von Heinrich Thannhauser / The „Moderne Galerie“ of Heinrich Thannhauser. Sammelbilder / Collecting Images, 6. Minerva, München 2008. (Zur gleichnamigen Ausstellung. Jüdisches Museum München, 30. Januar 2008 – 25. Mai 2008.)

See also 

 Thannhauser Galleries
 Max G. Bollag
 Justin Thannhauser

References

External links 

 
 Dokumente der Thannhauser-Galerien: Aus dem Zentralarchiv 27. bei FAZ.NET
 Beschreibung der Galerie im Arco-Palais:  April 1910, S. 13 (online bei ANNO).Vorlage:ANNO/Wartung/sus (Folgeseiten 14 und 15)

1859 births
1934 deaths
Jewish emigrants from Nazi Germany to Switzerland
Jewish art collectors
20th-century German Jews